Swagatam is a 2008 Telugu-language romance film and directed by Dasarath. It stars Jagapati Babu, Anushka Shetty, Arjun Sarja and Bhumika Chawla, with music composed by R. P. Patnaik.

Shot in New York City, Rajahmundry and Hampi, it features a romantic triangle. Directed by Dasarath, the film casts Jagapati Babu as the male romantic lead playing opposite Anushka Shetty and Bhumika Chawla. Several weeks after its release, The Times of India declared the movie a box office "let down". The film was dubbed in Tamil as America to Aminjaikarai.

Plot
The film begins at  the US where Shailaja / Shailu fretful woman strives hard for survival. She dotes on her siblings’ Deepthi’s son Chiku and kicks his father Srikanth. Since she opines him as a homicide of Deepthi in an accident and remarried shortly. Anyhow, Chiku craves Srikanth’s love. Sailu runs a textile business in their colony where people of diverse mindsets stay. Plus, her enterprise is on its way to shutting down. So, she also works as a moonlight for its sustainability. 

At that time, KK / Krishna a hyperactive widower enters their colony along with his daughter Janaki / Jaanu. He opens a shop anti to Shailu when hostility arises between them. After a series of donnybrook, KK fills her angry head with smiles and flourishes her bankruptcy business. Afterward, Sailu is aware that KK is the bestie of Srikanth who is silently aiding them. Accordingly, she salvos when KK divulges the actuality. On the day of the mishap, Deepthi indeed made it but Srikanth accused himself of saving her tragically she expired. In addition, he married a woman who has been afflicted by misfortune. Currently, Shailu seeks pardon from Srikanth, makes Chiku nearer to him, and loves KK. 

Here stunningly, KK states that his wife Vidya is still alive when Shailu conveys her love. Next, Srikanth reveals KK’s past to Shailu. Once, KK is a workaholic, rigid, and spartan person. Thus, he fails many matches to live up to the standards and his grandmother is fed-up with him. Following this, she consults a marriage bureau held by Vidya who gets in touch with KK. In her acquaintance, KK transforms, understands the real happiness in life, and knits her. The twosome spends jollity of time and is blessed with a daughter. Then, a catastrophic attack when Vidya is diagnosed with chronic leukemia. Hence, Vidya decides to walk far as their kid should not deject in between. 

Therefrom, she is continuing her treatment at Srikanth who is extending her life. One day, Vidya notifies Srikanth’s pain and desires to recoup his content as gratitude for which Krishna set foot in Shailu’s life. Now Shailu & Vidya are introduced and be friends. Later, Vidya leaves her last breath in Krishna's lap. At last, Srikanth hands over a letter to Shailu written by Vidya in which she requests Shailu to replace her position in Krishna’s life.  Finally, the movie ends on a happy note as Shailu moves to express her love according to the final wish of Vidya and waits for the reply of Krishna.

Cast

 Jagapati Babu as K.K. / Krishna
 Anushka Shetty as Shailu
 Bhumika Chawla as Vidya Krishna
 Arjun as Srikanth
 Dharmavarapu Subramanyam as Srinu Ganepudi
 Ali as Jilal Khan
 Sunil as Sunil Honda
 Venu Madhav as Peon
 Mallikarjuna Rao as RV Sukara
 M. S. Narayana as Detroit Nageswara Rao
 L. B. Sriram
 Ravi Babu as Padmakar "Padhu" Mudumba
 Banerjee as Ram Pasumarthy
 Jaya Prakash Reddy
 Sarath Babu
 Melkote as Dr. Chitti
 Raja Ravindra as Dr. Ravi
 Prabhakar as RV Sukara
 Satyam Rajesh as Servant
 Lakshmipathi as Sesha Reddy
 Kadambari Kiran
 Gundu Sudarshan
 Gautam Raju
 Chitti Babu
 Sudha as Lakshmi Durga
 Rama Prabha as Saru
 Radha Kumari
 Jhansi as Supraja
 Asha Saini as Deepthi
 Medha Bahri
 Likitha Kamini
 Madhurisen
 Baby Annie as K.K.'s daughter

Soundtrack

Music composed by R. P. Patnaik. Music released on ADITYA Music Company.

Similarities with Kal Ho Na Ho
The film has got quite some similarities with the Hindi film, Kal Ho Na Ho. starring Shah Rukh Khan, Preity Zinta and Saif Ali Khan.  A hard working, depressed girl settled in New York, supporting her mother and a child independently.  A business that's not doing well.

Reception
Critically, the film met lukewarm reception. In its generally positive review, IndiaGlitz described the film as a "sincere effort" that "may or may not appeal to everyone as it becomes a bit trite as it progresses". While noting that "we cannot say it is something that we haven’t watched before", the reviewers also commented that the film "starts off in a novel way as far as a Telugu film is concerned". Addressing the high expectations of the big budget film, they conclude, "To be fair to Dasarath, he does not disappoint. In the sense that it is what one would typically go to watch in a Jagapati Babu movie". AndhraCafe praised the performances specifically of Bumika, "at her very best", and found the chemistry between Babu and Bumika "a treat to watch". While they also felt the director exhibited moments of brilliance in the second half of the film, they panned the climax and particularly the opening, stating that "[t]he first half of a film couldn’t be more boring than this". They concluded that "[o]n a whole the film is below average fare with the weak first half, dragged climax and poor music". In its review, Rediff notes that Swagatam takes the "safe, oft-trodden path" but praises the acting, describing specifically the first half of the film as "laced with entertainment". They predict that the film "will go down well with those liking mushy stuff".

References

External links
 

2008 films
Indian films set in New York City
Films shot in New York City
Films shot in Karnataka
Films shot in Andhra Pradesh
2000s Telugu-language films